Edward Joseph Doyle (July 5, 1905 – November 8, 1942) was a professional American football offensive lineman in the National Football League. He played one season for the Buffalo Bisons (1927).

1905 births
1942 deaths
Players of American football from Buffalo, New York
American football offensive linemen
Canisius Golden Griffins football players
Buffalo Bisons (NFL) players
United States Army officers
United States Army personnel killed in World War II